Brian Douglas Birdwell (born November 3, 1961) is an American politician who has served in the Texas Senate for District 22 since 2010. He is a survivor of the September 11, 2001 attacks against The Pentagon.

Early life and education
Born in Fort Worth, Texas, Birdwell earned a Bachelor of Science degree in criminology from Lamar University in 1984 and a Master of Public Administration from the University of Missouri–Kansas City in 1996.

Career
In 2001, Birdwell was working with the United States Army at The Pentagon. Two days after being injured when American Airlines Flight 77 crashed into The Pentagon, Birdwell met President George W. Bush. Rob Maness, a United States Air Force officer who rescued Birdwell, learned about Birdwell's identity only when they met at the 2016 Republican National Convention.

He holds a Purple Heart and a Legion of Merit.

Elections
He defeated David Sibley in a June 22, 2010 special election, replacing Kip Averitt.

Birdwell won the 2010 general election unopposed.

Legislation sponsored
In February 2017, Birdwell sponsored Senate Joint Resolution 2, which calls for a convention to propose amendments to the United States Constitution. The resolution "seeks amendments that place restraints on the federal budget and check power and enact term limits for U.S. officials." Senate Joint Resolution 2 was passed by both chambers of the Texas Legislature. In May 2017, Birdwell sponsored a bill outlining the duties and limits of Texas delegates should a convention of states occur. It was approved by the Texas House and sent to Texas Governor Greg Abbott.

Personal life
He has one son with his wife, Mel.

References

|-

1961 births
20th-century American memoirists
20th-century Baptists
21st-century American politicians
Baptists from Texas
Baptists from Virginia
Lamar University alumni
Living people
People from Granbury, Texas
People from Springfield, Virginia
Presidents pro tempore of the Texas Senate
Republican Party Texas state senators
Recipients of the Legion of Merit
Survivors of the September 11 attacks
United States Army colonels
United States Army personnel of the Gulf War
University of Missouri–Kansas City alumni
Military personnel from Texas